Kaan Korad is a Turkish classical guitarist.

Biography
He studied guitar with the Turkish Guitarist Ahmet Kanneci at the Department of Guitar, at Hacettepe University State Conservatory. Later, he became a student of Ireneuzs Strachocki at the University of Bilkent in Ankara, Turkey.

He was a member of Bilkent Guitar Trio. Currently he performs in a duo ensemble with the guitarist Kürşad Terci.Blackmore, op. cit.

See also
List of lead guitarists
Music of Turkey

References
 Sources consulted 

 
 Endnotes

External links
 University of Bilkent

Turkish classical guitarists
Hacettepe University alumni
Year of birth missing (living people)
Living people